Sinking Creek is a stream in Breckinridge County, Kentucky, in the United States. It is a tributary of the Ohio River.

Sinking Creek was so named because it is a subterranean river for some of its length, disappearing underground before surfacing again.

See also
List of rivers of Kentucky

References

Rivers of Breckinridge County, Kentucky
Rivers of Kentucky
Tributaries of the Ohio River